Erithacus (Greek: "robin" (erithacos)) is a genus of passerine bird that contains a single extant species, the European robin (Erithacus rubecula). The Japanese robin and Ryukyu robin were also placed in this genus (as Erithacus akahige and E. komadori), but were moved to the genus Larvivora in 2006.

Fossil species
†Erithacus horusitskyi Kessler & Hir, 2012 (Miocene of Hungary) 
†Erithacus minor Kessler, 2013 (Pliocene of Hungary)

References

Bird genera
Bird genera with one living species
Muscicapidae